Ernesto Corripio y Ahumada (June 29, 1919 – April 10, 2008) was a cardinal of the Roman Catholic Church.  He was Archbishop of Mexico in Mexico City (1977–1994) and was Primate of Mexico. In the consistory of June 30, 1979 in Vatican City Pope John Paul II created him Cardinal Priest of the titular church of Mary Immaculate of Tiburtino.

Life
Corripio y Ahumada was ordained to the priesthood on October 15, 1942. He served as a diocesan priest in his hometown of Tampico for ten years. On December 27, 1952, Pope Pius XII appointed him auxiliary bishop of the Diocese of Tampico.  On March 19, 1953, he was consecrated titular bishop of Zapara. On February 25, 1956, he became Bishop of the diocese.

Pope Paul VI elevated Corripio y Ahumada on July 25, 1967 to Archbishop of Antequera in the state of Oaxaca. On March 11, 1976, he was transferred to become Archbishop of the Archdiocese of Puebla de los Angeles in the state of Puebla. The Pope transferred Corripio y Ahumada once again on July 19, 1977 to the post of Archbishop of Mexico.

Upon assuming the papal throne, Pope John Paul II appointed Corripio y Ahumada a member of the College of Cardinals. He was a member of various departments of the Roman Curia while serving his archdiocese.

He retired on September 29, 1994, and lost the right to participate in a conclave when he reached 80 in 1999.

He died on April 10, 2008 in his house in La Noria, Xochimilco in Mexico City, after complications related to deep thrombosis in his left arm.  He is buried in the crypt of Mexico City Metropolitan Cathedral.

References

External links
Catholic Hierarchy Profile of Ernesto Corripio y Ahumada
El Universal Obituary 

1919 births
2008 deaths
Mexican cardinals
Participants in the Second Vatican Council
Roman Catholic archbishops of Mexico (city)
20th-century Roman Catholic archbishops in Mexico
Cardinals created by Pope John Paul II
Deaths from thrombosis
People from Tampico, Tamaulipas